Identikit is the second and final album by American rock band Burning Airlines, released in 2001.  In 2012, the German label Arctic Rodeo Recordings reissued the album as a marbled colour vinyl LP with enclosed CD in an edition of 700 copies (200 on white/blue, 250 on gold/white, 250 on red/black), with an added cover version of Sweet's "Action."

Track listing
All songs written by J. Robbins, except where noted.

 "Outside the Aviary" – 1:50
 "Morricone Dancehall" – 2:52
 "A Lexicon" – 3:28
 "A Song With No Words" – 3:56
 "All Sincerity" – 2:40
 "The Surgeon's House" – 3:59
 "The Deluxe War Baby" – 3:32
 "Everything Here Is New" – 3:18
 "Paper Crowns" – 2:46
 "Blind Trial" – 2:25
 "Identikit" – 3:17
 "Election-Night Special" - 2:05
 "Tastykake" – 4:14
 "Earthbound" – 2:09
 "Dear Hilary" (Scott Ritcher) – 2:31
 "Action" - 3:33 (Andy Scott, Brian Connolly, Steve Priest, Mick Tucker) (2012 reissue)

Personnel
J.Robbins – vocals, guitars, noises
Mike Harbin – bass guitar, sounds, "good judgement"
Peter Moffett – drums, percussion, idiophone, membranophones, backing vocals, "things that go plunk, plink, And ting-a-ling"

References

2001 albums
Burning Airlines albums